Llamayuq Q'asa (Quechua llama llama, -yuq a suffix, q'asa mountain pass, "mountain pass with llamas", also spelled Llamayoj Khasa) is a mountain in the Bolivian Andes which reaches a height of approximately . It is located in the Cochabamba Department, Ayopaya Province, Cocapata Municipality. Llamayuq Q'asa lies northeast of a lake named Wallatani Quta.

References 

Mountains of Cochabamba Department